John Andrew Boyle (1916− 19 November, 1978), was a British orientalist and historian.

Life and career 
He was born at Worcester Park, Surrey, England, on 10 March 1916. He graduated with first class honours in German at Birmingham University. He later pursued the studies of Oriental languages at the universities of Berlin and Göttingen.

He completed his doctoral dissertation under the guidance of Vladimir Minorsky.

He later became a professor of Persian at Manchester University.

He produced a Persian dictionary and a grammar book of modern Persian.

He was the only European ever to receive the Iranian order of Sepas.

Bibliography 
He was the author of the following books:

 The history of the world-conqueror / 'Ala-ad-Din 'Ata-Malik Juvaini. - Manchester : Manchester Univ. Press, 1958 (2 Bände)
 Grammar of modern Persian / by John Andrew Boyle. Wiesbaden : Harrassowitz, 1966 (Porta linguarum orientalium ; N.S., 9)
 The successors of Genghis Khan / Rašīd-ad-Dīn Faḍlallāh. - New York [u.a.] : Columbia Univ. Press, 1971
 The Cambridge history of Iran / [Board of ed. A. J. Arberry ...] Vol. 5: The Saljuq and Mongol periods / ed. by J. A. Boyle. Cambridge Univ. Press, 1968
 The Ilāhī-Nāma or Book of God of Farīd al-Din ʿAṭṭār / transl. from the Persian by John Andrew Boyle. With a foreword by Annemarie Schimmel. Manchester : Univ. Press, 1976 (Persian heritage series)
 The Mongol World Empire : 1206 - 1370 / John Andrew Boyle. London : Variorum Reprints, 1977 (Collected studies series ; 58)

References

External links 
 https://archive.org/details/historyoftheworl011648mbp
 http://www.tandfonline.com/doi/abs/10.1080/0015587X.1979.9716129?journalCode=rfol20#.UmJthnDXCE4
 http://www.iranicaonline.org/articles/boyle-john-andrew-1916-78-british-orientalist

1916 births
1978 deaths
Academics of the Victoria University of Manchester
20th-century British historians
English orientalists
Iranologists
Zoroastrian studies scholars
20th-century translators
Alumni of the University of Birmingham